Brachodes nanetta is a moth of the family Brachodidae. It is found in Portugal, Spain and Morocco.

The larvae feed on Dactylis glomerata, Agrostis castellana, Celtica gigantea and Festuca ampla. Larval development takes two years.

References

Moths described in 1922
Brachodidae